Cheese Cat-Astrophe Starring Speedy Gonzales is a platform game developed by Cryo Interactive and published by Sega in 1995 for the Game Gear, Master System, and Mega Drive. Only the Game Gear version was released in North America.

Plot
Sylvester, under the alter-ego Dr. Cheesefinger, has "kitnapped" the cheese supply and Speedy Gonzales' girlfriend, Carmel. Speedy Gonzales must outwit the callous cat and rescue both.

Reception

The four reviewers Electronic Gaming Monthly gave the Game Gear version a 5.5 out of 10, commenting that though the graphics and gameplay are both outstanding, the Game Gear hardware isn't powerful enough to handle them, and the resultant screen blurring whenever Speedy is in motion makes it virtually impossible to avoid taking hits. GamePro made similar comments, but blamed the difficulty in avoiding hits on the fact that Speedy is always positioned at the center of the screen, even when running, thus cutting down the time the player has to react to hazards when they scroll onto the screen. They also gave the game a more positive overall assessment, dubbing it "a fun little game."

References

Sources

External links

1995 video games
Cartoon Network video games
Cryo Interactive games
Game Gear games
Master System games
Platform games
Sega Genesis games
Sega video games
Single-player video games
Time Warner Interactive games
Video games about mice and rats
Video games developed in France
Video games featuring Sylvester the Cat